The Ondrej Nepela Arena (also known as Orange Arena during the 2011 IIHF Championship, or as Slovnaft Arena) is an indoor arena in Bratislava, Slovakia. It is primarily used for ice hockey and it is the home arena of the HC Slovan Bratislava.

History
It opened in 1940 and held 8,350 people until its full reconstruction started in 2009. The reconstructed arena opened in spring 2011 with one of the most advance game presentation, LED scoreboards and security systems ever built. It has increased capacity to 10,055 spectators. In the past Samsung arena was called ST Arena and T-Com Arena. Reconstruction costs 87 million €.

In the arena are also next two ice areas in the training halls. In addition to the arena, a new DoubleTree by Hilton hotel was built, which mainly serves for the accommodation of foreign athletes.

The arena is named in honour of Ondrej Nepela, Slovak figure skater who competed for Czechoslovakia in the late 1960s and early 1970s, the 1972 Winter Olympics figure skating winner.

Notable events
An overview of some sport events:

1958
1958 European Figure Skating Championships

1959
1959 IIHF World Championship

1966
1966 European Figure Skating Championships

1973
1973 World Figure Skating Championships

1981
1981 FIBA European Championship

1992
1992 IIHF World Championship

1995
1995 IIHF World Championship Group B

1996
1996 ISBHF Ball Hockey World Championship
1996 European Table Tennis Championships

1999
1999 European Judo Championships

2001
2001 European Figure Skating Championships

2008
2008 IIHF Men's InLine Hockey World Championship

2011
2011 IIHF World Championship
2011 ISBHF Ball Hockey World Championship

2016
2016 European Figure Skating Championships
2016 Women's Youth World Handball Championship

2017
2017 IIHF Inline Hockey World Championship
2017 Women's World Floorball Championships

2019
2019 IIHF World Championship
2019 WUKF Karate World Championship
2019 Women's European Volleyball Championship

2021
Ice hockey at the 2022 Winter Olympics – Men's qualification group D

2022
2022 European Men's Handball Championship

An NHL pre-season game was held at the Samsung Arena between HC Slovan Bratislava and the Tampa Bay Lightning on September 30, 2008. Tampa Bay won 3–2 in overtime. On October 2, 2011, the arena hosted another NHL pre-season game, this time between HC Slovan Bratislava and New York Rangers who beat the home team 4–1.

Transport
Ondrej Nepela Arena is located in the third district of Bratislava, Slovakia. The arena can be approached by tram, trolleybus and bus.

Drivers can park directly under the Ondrej Nepela Arena. There are place for 365 cars. An additional 1,300 parking spaces offer the Central Shopping Center, which is approximately 400 m away from the arena. Next 994 parking spaces are under National Football Stadium, which is 300 m away.

Gallery

References

External links

Buildings and structures in Bratislava
Indoor ice hockey venues in Slovakia
Sport in Bratislava
HC Slovan Bratislava
Sports venues completed in 1940
1940 establishments in Slovakia